The Egyptian Revolution Party  is an Egyptian political party in Egypt. The party ran in the Egyptian 2011-2012 parliamentary election.

References 

Political parties with year of establishment missing
Political parties in Egypt